Aleksandar Vasiljević may refer to:
 Aleksandar Vasiljević (general)
 Aleksandar Vasiljević (footballer, born 1982)
 Aleksandar Vasiljević (footballer, born 2001)